Vim Yapan, also known as Alvin Yapan is a Filipino director.

Filmography

TV

 Titser

References

Living people
Filipino film directors
Year of birth missing (living people)
Place of birth missing (living people)